Bashmakovsky District is an administrative and municipal district (raion), one of the twenty-seven in Penza Oblast, Russia. It is located in the west of the oblast. Its administrative center is the urban locality (a work settlement) of Bashmakovo. Population: 23,304 (2010 Census);  The population of Bashmakovo accounts for 44.7% of the district's total population.

Notable residents 

Anna Konkina (born 1947 in Kirillovka), racing cyclist

References

Notes

Sources

Districts of Penza Oblast